Louis Charles Marie de La Trémoille (28 March 1863 – 17 June 1921), 10th Duke of Thouars, 16th Count of Laval was a French nobleman and the son of Louis Charles de La Trémoille and his wife Marguerite Églé Jeanne Caroline Duchâtel (daughter of Count Charles Marie Tanneguy Duchâtel, Count Duchâtel and his wife Rosalie ("Eglé") Paulée)

La Trémoille was a deputy for Gironde from 1906 to 1919, and mayor of Margaux from 1904 to 1919.  He was a member of the democratic left.

Family
On 1 February 1892, he married Hélène Marie Léonie Pillet-Will (27 January 1875 – 24 March 1964), the daughter of Count Frédéric Pillet-Will and his wife, Jeanne Marie Clotilde Briatte. They had five children:

 Princess Charlotte (1892–1971);married Prince Henri Florent Lamoral of Ligne (1881–1967)
 Prince Jean Charles Lamoral of Ligne-La Trémoïlle
 Princess Hedwige de Ligne,married to the Prince de Mérode
 Prince Emmanuel de Merode
 Prince Charles-Antoine Lamoral of Ligne-La Trémoïlle
 Princess Marguerite (1894–1939); married the Duke of Blacas, Stanislas de Blacas d'Aulps (1885–1941)
 Princess Hélène (1899–1972); married Gilbert de La Rochefoucauld, Duke de La Roche-Guyon (1889–1964)
 Princess Antoinette (1904–1996);  married Henri, 8th Duke d'Ursel
 Antonin, 9th Duke d'Ursel
 Prince Louis Jean Marie (1910–1933), his successor.

1838 births
1911 deaths
Louis Charles Marie
Dukes of Thouars
Politicians of the French Third Republic
People of Byzantine descent